William Horton Jr. (born May 25, 1939) is an American sailor. He competed in the Dragon event at the 1952 Summer Olympics.

References

External links
 

1939 births
Living people
American male sailors (sport)
Olympic sailors of the United States
Sailors at the 1952 Summer Olympics – Dragon
Sportspeople from Los Angeles